Environment and Forests Department may refer to these government agencies in India:

 Environment and Forests Department (Arunachal Pradesh)
 Environment and Forests Department (Assam)
 Environment and Forests Department (Tamil Nadu)
 Environment and Forests Department (Uttarakhand)